Chikanhalli, is a village in the southern state of Karnataka, India. Administratively, Chikanhalli is under Kachaknoor gram panchayat, Shorapur Taluka of Yadgir District in Karnataka.  The village of Chikanhalli is 4 km by road east-southeast of the village of Bonal and 17 km by road northwest of the village of Hunasagi. The nearest railhead is in Yadgir.

Demographics 
 census, Chikanhalli had 1,659 inhabitants, with 860 males and 799 females.

Notes

External links 
 

Villages in Yadgir district